The 1996–97 FA Trophy was the twenty-eighth season of the FA Trophy.

First qualifying round
The matches (not including replays) were played on October 19, 1996.

Ties

Replays

2nd replay

Second qualifying round
The matches (no including replays) were played on November 9, 1996.

Ties

Replays

Third qualifying round
The matches (not including replays) were played on November 30, 1996.

Ties

Replays

1st round
The teams that given byes to this round are Macclesfield Town, Stevenage Borough, Woking, Hednesford Town, Gateshead, Southport, Kidderminster Harriers, Northwich Victoria, Morecambe, Farnborough Town, Bromsgrove Rovers, Altrincham, Telford United, Stalybridge Celtic, Halifax Town, Kettering Town, Slough Town, Bath City, Welling United, Dover Athletic, Rushden & Diamonds, Hayes, Methyr Tydfil, Guiseley, Enfield, Hyde United, Halesowen Town, Gresley Rovers, Bamber Bridge, Boston United, Chorley and Boreham Wood. 

The matches (not including replays) were played on January 18, 1997.

Ties

Replays

2nd replays

2nd round
The matches (not including replays) were played on February 8, 1997.

Ties

Replays

2nd replay

3rd round
The matches (not including replays) were played on March 1, 1997.

Ties

Replays

2nd replay

4th round
The matches (not including replays) were played on March 22, 1997.

Ties

Replay

Semi-finals
The first legs were played on April 5, 1997, and the second legs were played on April 12, 1997.

First leg

Second leg

Replays
Both replays were held on neutral grounds: the replay between Dagenham & Redbridge and Gloucester City was held at Slough Town, while the one between Stevenage Borough and Woking was at Vicarage Road, home to Watford.

Final
The match was played on May 18, 1997, at Wembley Stadium.

Tie

References

General
 Football Club History Database: FA Trophy 1996-97

Specific

1996–97 domestic association football cups
League
1996-97